The 2020 FIBA U17 Women's Basketball World Cup would have been an international basketball competition to be held in Cluj-Napoca, Romania. It would have been the sixth edition of the FIBA Under-17 Women's Basketball World Cup. Sixteen national teams were scheduled to compete in the tournament. It was originally scheduled to take place from 15 to 23 August 2020, but on 12 June, FIBA postponed the tournament due to the COVID-19 pandemic and options were examined to play in 2021. An official release from FIBA on this event's cancellation has yet to be published.

Qualified teams

Draw
The draw for the tournament was held on 4 March 2020 in Cluj-Napoca, Romania.

Seedings
The seedings were announced on 4 March 2020.

Preliminary round

Group A

Group B

Group C

Group D

Final round

Bracket

9–16th classification playoffs

5–8th classification playoffs

Final ranking

References

External links
Official website

2020
2020 in youth sport
2020 in women's basketball
2020 in Romanian sport
International women's basketball competitions hosted by Romania
International youth basketball competitions hosted by Romania
2020
Basketball events cancelled due to the COVID-19 pandemic
2020 in Romanian women's sport